"Força" (Portuguese for "strength") is a song by Canadian singer Nelly Furtado from her second studio album, Folklore (2003). Written by Furtado, Gerald Eaton, and Brian West, the track is sung mainly in English, with the chorus completely in Portuguese. The song was produced by Track & Field and received a positive reception from music critics. Released in June 2004 as the album's third single, served as the official song of the 2004 European Football Championship held in Portugal.

Background and writing
Nelly Furtado said about the song: "When I was touring in Portugal, people would frequently say goodbye to me by saying 'Força', which is Portuguese slang. It translates as 'Keep going', or 'Kick ass'. It's also associated with sports, especially football. I put a feminine twist on the idea of how you feel when you're watching your favorite team. When you tie that into nationality, it becomes pretty intense. So this is a happy song, a burst of energy. Plus, we have [banjoist] Béla Fleck playing on the song. His contribution here is amazing".

Music video
The music video was shot in Toronto, Ontario and directed by Ulf Buddensiek. It was released in 2005 to the iTunes music Store.

The music video begins with Furtado wearing a pink top and gold hoop earrings, and a necklace with her hair tied back, singing in an alley way while in front of the camera. In the back drop while Furtado is singing, a boy with the Portugal national football team shirt is playing with a football and doing tricks. It also shows Furtado sitting on a ledge in the video singing to the camera. In the middle of the video the boy accidentally kicks the ball too high and it gets stuck on the pipes in the corner of the apartment building where he's playing. As Furtado continues singing more and more people come to help the little boy and they end up building a human pyramid to lift and support him up the side of the building. Furtado finally joins the pyramid and the group lifts the boy up to his ball.

The version of the song used in the video is different from the album version. It's the version that was prepared to be used on the Eurovision Song Contest 2004 (a.k.a. Swiss American Federation Mix Edit) which Nelly Furtado composed for Portugal. The second version of the video features a Radio Edit for the Album version.

Track listings
German and UK CD single
 "Força" (radio edit) – 2:58
 "Força" (Swiss American Federation Mix) – 3:08
 "Powerless (Say What You Want)" (Spanish version featuring Juanes) – 3:54
 "Força" (video) – 3:40German two-track single "Força" (radio edit) – 2:58
 "Força" (Swiss American Federation Mix) – 3:08

Credits and personnel
Credits are lifted from the Folklore album booklet.Studios Recorded at The Gymnasium (Santa Monica, California) and Metalworks Studios (Mississauga, Canada)
 Mastered at Bernie Grundman Mastering (Hollywood, California)Personnel'''

 Nelly Furtado – writing, lead and background vocals, production
 Gerald Eaton – writing
 Brian West – writing, engineering
 Track & Field – production, programming
 Field – stadium guitar
 Béla Fleck – banjo
 Dean Jarvis – bass
 Gurpreet Chana – tabla
 Luis Simao – accordion
 Brad Haehnel – mixing, engineering
 Joe Labatto – engineering
 Steve Chahley – engineering assistance
 Ian Bodzasi – engineering assistance
 Brian "Big Bass" Gardner – mastering

Charts

Weekly charts

Year-end charts

Release history

References

External links
 "Força" Music Video - YouTube

2003 songs
2004 singles
DreamWorks Records singles
Macaronic songs
Nelly Furtado songs
Songs written by Brian West (musician)
Songs written by Gerald Eaton
Songs written by Nelly Furtado
UEFA Euro 2004
UEFA European Championship official songs and anthems